Lloyd White (born 9 August 1988) is a Welsh international rugby league footballer who plays as a  for Toulouse Olympique in the Betfred Championship.

He has previously played for Crusaders RL and spent time playing for the South Wales Scorpions. He played as a  earlier in his career.

Background
White was born in Cardiff, Wales. He is of Jamaican heritage.

Playing career

Crusaders

White made six appearances for Crusaders in his début season of 2009. Following the demise of Crusaders, White joined Widnes, starting in 2012.

South Wales Scorpions
He spent some time on loan at the South Wales Scorpions in 2010.

Widnes Vikings
On 1 May 2014, White committed to the Vikings on a new two-year deal.

Toulouse Olympique
On 5 November 2019, Toulouse announced that they had signed Lloyd White from Australian side Mackay Cutters for the 2020 season.

In June 2020, shortly before the 2020 Championship season was abandoned due to Covid 19, White announced that he had extended his contract with Toulouse for the 2021 season with an option for 2022.

On 14 October 2021, Toulouse announced that White had extended his contract until the end of the 2022 season.

International career
White has represented his native Wales at international level in 2009, making his début in the 42-12 win over Ireland in the European Cup, and going on to play in the final winning team against Scotland, scoring a try in a 28-16 win.

White was named the Wales player of the year in 2011 at the RLIF awards.

In September 2015, John Kear named White as the Wales national team captain for the 2015 European Cup tournament. On 12 October, however, he required surgery on an injured knee so he therefore withdrew from the squad.

In October 2016, White played for Wales in the 2017 World Cup qualifiers.

He was selected in the Wales 9s squad for the 2019 Rugby League World Cup 9s.

In 2021, White was named in the train-on squad for  the Jamaica national rugby league team ahead of the 2021 Rugby League World Cup.

References

External links
Widnes Vikings profile

Statistics at rugby-league.com

1988 births
Crusaders Rugby League players
Living people
Rugby league five-eighths
Rugby league hookers
Rugby league players from Cardiff
Rumney RFC players
South Wales Scorpions players
Toulouse Olympique players
Wales national rugby league team captains
Wales national rugby league team players
Widnes Vikings players